Shaver is a surname. Notable people with the surname include:

 Al Shaver, Canadian retired sportscaster, member of the Hockey Hall of Fame
 Billy Joe Shaver (1939–2020), American country music singer and songwriter
 Clem L. Shaver (1867–1954), American politician
 Daniel Shaver (1989–2016), American shooting victim
 Donald Shaver (1920–2018), Canadian pioneer in the poultry industry
 Dorothy Shaver (1893–1959), first woman in the United States to head a multimillion-dollar firm
 Earnie Shavers (born 1944), American retired professional boxer born Earnie Shaver
 Eddy Shaver (1962–2000), American country-rock guitarist, arranger, and songwriter; son of Billy Joe Shaver
 Frank Thomas Shaver (1881–1969), Canadian politician
 Gaius Shaver (1910–1998), American college football player
 George Washington Shaver (1832–1900), American pioneer, founder of the Shaver Transportation Company
 Helen Shaver (born 1951), Canadian actress
 James L. Shaver (1902–1985), American politician
 James L. Shaver Jr. (born 1922), American politician; son of the above
 Jeff Shaver (born 1963), American baseball player
 Leonidas Shaver (died 1855), Utah Territorial Supreme Court justice
 Mike Shaver (born 1977), member of the Mozilla project
 Peter Shaver (1776–1866), farmer, businessman and politician in Upper Canada
 Richard Sharpe Shaver (1907–1975), American writer and artist
 Robert G. Shaver (1831–1915), American lawyer, militia leader, American Civil War Confederate colonel, and a Ku Klux Klan leader
 Ron Shaver (born 1951), Canadian retired figure skater
 Stephanie Shaver (born 1975), writer, artist, and computer game designer
 Tony Shaver (born 1954), American basketball player and coach

Fictional characters
 Ryan Shaver, a character in the novel and Netflix series 13 Reasons Why

See also 

 Shavers (disambiguation)

Occupational surnames
English-language occupational surnames